Fernando Nakpil Zialcita is a Filipino anthropologist and cultural historian. His areas of specialization are in heritage and identity; art and its cultural context; and interfaces between the foreign and the indigenous.

Zialcita is a professor at the Department of Sociology and Anthropology at the Jesuit-run Ateneo de Manila University and is program director of the Ateneo Social and Cultural Laboratory (ASCL). He obtained his M.A. in philosophy at the Ateneo de Manila University and an M.A. and Ph.D. in anthropology from the University of Hawaiʻi.

His work Authentic Though Not Exotic: Essays on Filipino Identity (2005) argues against views of Filipino identity (in particular, those of the lowland Christian Filipino) as "bastardized," "corrupted," non-Asian, or too Western. Such attitudes, he claims, generally stems from the (1) "demonization of Spanish influence; (2) a limited menu of binaries of interpreting culture (i.e., colonial versus noncolonial/anticolonial and Asia versus West); (3) and reductionist [nativist] views" of culture among Filipinos, including intellectuals and scholars.

For Zialcita, lowland Christian Filipino culture, though not "exotic," (i.e., alluding to the preference of scholars and anthropologists for "uncontaminated" upland peoples as subjects for study) is an authentic and syncretic, and distinct culture, able to hold its own scholarly interest.

He proposes appreciating Filipino culture as one that is mestizo, where cultural mestizaje (derived from Mexican "mixing") is viewed as a desirable process, "articulated in terms of tensions and oppositions which are accepted as part of being human" (230). The word mestizo which implies a blending of cultures carries with it more positive associations in contrast to notions of hybridity, "mongrel," or "half-breed." Owing to a shared (syncretic or mestizo) Spanish heritage, Zialcita proposes increased interaction and comparative works between Filipino and Latin American scholars.

Personal life
Zialcita is part of the Nakpil family of Quiapo, Manila who are direct descendants of musician and composer Julio Nakpil and Gregoria de Jesús, founder of the women's chapter of the Katipunan and widow of revolutionary leader Andres Bonifacio. He is a board member of The Bahay Nakpil-Bautista Foundation, Inc., a foundation dedicated to the preservation of the historic Nakpil-Bautista ancestral house.

Zialcita is fluent in Filipino, English, and Spanish.

Published works
Philippine Ancestral Houses,1810-1930. (1980).

Notions of Justice: A Study of an Ilocos and a Bulacan Barangay. (1989).

Tropical Living: Contemporary Dream Houses in the Philippines. (1990). (Ed. with Elizabeth V. Reyes, Paulo Alcazaren, and A. Chester Ong).

The Soul Book: Introduction to Philippine Pagan Religion (The Philippine Reader No. 1). (1991). (Ed. with Francisco R. Demetrio, Gilda Cordero-Fernando, and Roberto B. Feleo).

Filipino Style. (1997). (Ed. with Rene Javellana, Fernando Nakpil-Zialcita, Luca Invernizzi Tettoni [Photographer] and Tara Sosrowardoyo [Photographer], and Elizabeth V. Reyes).

Cuaresma. (2000). (Ed. with Gilda Cordero-Fernando).

Authentic Though Not Exotic: Essays on Filipino Identity. (2005). Ateneo de Manila University Press. [Winner, National Book Award (2006)].

Quiapo: Heart of Manila (2006). (Ed.).

Endangered Splendor (with E. Akpedonu, V. Venida) [forthcoming].

See also
Nick Joaquin

References

Year of birth missing (living people)
Living people
20th-century Filipino historians
21st-century Filipino historians
Filipino anthropologists
Ateneo de Manila University alumni
University of Hawaiʻi at Mānoa alumni
Academic staff of Ateneo de Manila University